Örnsköldsvik North station (Swedish: Örnsköldsviks norra station or simply Örnsköldsvik norra) is the minor of two railway stations in Örnsköldsvik, Sweden. The distance to the major station in the city, Örnsköldsvik Central, is about 2 kilometres. The station opened in 2010 as part of the Bothnia Line between Umeå and Sundsvall. It is served daily by regional Norrtåg rail services.

The station is located in an area with large workplaces like the Örnsköldsvik Hospital and the military vehicle manufacturer BAE Systems Hägglunds. The main purpose for the station can therefore be considered to serve regional commuters.

Gallery

References 

Bothnia Line
Railway stations in Västernorrland County
Railway stations opened in 2010